José Luis de Mirecki Ruiz-Casaux (September 2, 1922September 2, 2000) was a Spanish economist.

He was a nephew of the famed cellist Juan Ruiz Casaux.

People from Madrid
1922 births
2000 deaths
20th-century  Spanish economists